Skyway Estates Airport  is a privately-owned, public use general aviation airport located approximately 4 miles north of Eaton Rapids in Eaton Rapids Township, Eaton County, Michigan, United States.

Facilities and aircraft
Skyway Estates Airport has one runway. The airport is attended intermittently, and only during the day. 

The airport has one runway, designated as runway 8/26. It measures 2,653 x 100 ft (809 x 30 m) and is made of turf. For the 12-month period ending December 31, 2019, the airport has 504 aircraft operations per year, an average of 42 per month. It is comprised entirely of general aviation. For the same time period, 10 aircraft are based at the airport, all single-engine airplanes.

The airport does not have a fixed-base operator, and no fuel is available.

The airport is accessible by road from Columbia Highway, and is located approximately 1 mile west of M-99.

Accidents and incidents 

 On October 13, 1996, a Dellicker Starduster Too SA300 was destroyed when it impacted the terrain during the initial climb following takeoff from Skyway Estates Airports. Witnesses reported that the pilot performed an aggressive pull up and subsequently lost control of the airplane a few hundred feet above the ground, entering a steep right turn. The probable cause of the accident was found to be the pilot's failure to maintain adequate airspeed and subsequent inadvertent stall of the airplane.
 On January 13, 2022, Piper PA-28 Cherokee crashed after departure from Skyway Estates airport. The crash is under investigation.

References

External links 
  

Airports in Michigan
Buildings and structures in Eaton County, Michigan
Transportation in Eaton County, Michigan